Bigfoot is a monster truck. The original Bigfoot began as a 1974 Ford F-250 pickup that was modified by its owner Bob Chandler beginning in 1975. By 1979, the modifications were so extensive, the truck came to be regarded as the first monster truck. Other trucks with the name "Bigfoot" have been introduced in the years since, and it remains a well-known monster truck moniker in the United States.

Early history
A former construction worker and off-roading enthusiast from the St. Louis area, Chandler began racing in 1975, using the Chandler family's 1974 Ford F-250 four-wheel drive pickup truck and found that automotive shops in the Midwest generally did not carry the parts needed to repair the frequent damage. To remedy this problem, Chandler and his wife Marilyn, along with friend Jim Kramer, opened a shop called Midwest Four Wheel Drive and Performance Center in Ferguson, Missouri. The shop moved to Hazelwood, Missouri, in 1984, which remained as Bigfoot's headquarters until 2015 when the headquarters was relocated to Pacific, Missouri.

In 1979, Chandler replaced the under assembly of the truck with one from a military-surplus top loader featuring four-wheel drive and four-wheel steering that used 48-inch tires. This modification drew attention and Chandler started making appearances at tractor pulls and car shows with his newly christened "Bigfoot" (so named for Chandler's heavy-footed racing style which caused frequent breakage of parts) to show off the truck's capabilities as well as to promote his shop. The truck's growing popularity led to its appearance in the 1981 Gus Trikonis film Take This Job and Shove It (which also features the early monster truck USA-1 credited under a different name).

Chandler's next experiment would prove revolutionary. In 1981, Chandler placed two dilapidated cars in a field, so that Chandler could videotape himself crushing the cars with Bigfoot as a joke. When Chandler began playing the video in his shop, a man promoting a motorsports event in Columbia, Missouri, asked him to duplicate the stunt in front of a crowd. After initial hesitation because of the destructive image it would convey, Chandler eventually agreed to perform at the event in April of the following year in what is believed to be the first public car crush. Later that year, a second Bigfoot, built to help meet the steadily rising demand to see the vehicle and sporting 66-inch tall tires, received more major media attention by crushing cars at the Pontiac Silverdome in Pontiac, Michigan. In 1983, Bigfoot began receiving sponsorship from Ford Motor Company, a relationship which continued until 2005.

By 1984, many truck owners around the country had taken to imitating Chandler's template of outfitting their vehicles with tires standing 66 inches tall, with some trucks sporting even larger tires. Promoters of truck and tractor pulls, such as SRO Motorsports (later the United States Hot Rod Association) and Golden State Promotions, noticed the exploding popularity of the giant trucks and began booking several to crush cars at their events, with the eventual result being the advent of side-by-side, drag-racing style car crushing events. A popular example of the early days of monster truck racing is portrayed in the 1986 home video release Return of the Monster Trucks, which involves a truck pull, car crushing, and mud bogging all in the same course. That event, held in the Louisiana Superdome, was won by Bigfoot, as well as most of the events it was entered into in the mid-1980s. By this point, Chandler had already built an entire fleet of "Bigfoot" trucks to accommodate the vast demand for his vehicle, which remained as the most popular and marketable monster truck despite the large number of imitators. In 1987, Chandler added to his innovations by founding the Monster Truck Racing Association, which remains today as the chief voice in monster truck safety.

Another form of competition Chandler faced was the physical size of the competition. Many truck owners had taken to calling their vehicles the "world's largest monster truck", so Chandler outfitted his "Bigfoot 4" vehicle with 10-foot-tall tires he had purchased from a junkyard owner in Seattle, for $1000. The tires had been previously used by the US Army in Alaska on their overland train in the 1950s. In 1986, Chandler built a new truck, "Bigfoot 5", specifically for the tires. Upon its public debut in Indianapolis, Indiana, the truck immediately took the title of the "world's tallest, widest, and heaviest monster truck" and was eventually given official recognition of the title by the Guinness Book of Records in 2002. With a second set of 10-foot-tall tires attached, the truck stands 15 feet, six inches high, measures 20 feet, 5 inches across, and weighs over 38,000 pounds.

Racing history
The fledgling all-sports television network ESPN also took note of the popularity of monster trucks in the 1980s and began showing events promoted by the United States Hot Rod Association and TNT Motorsports on a regular basis. With the frequent broadcasts of monster truck races, the next logical step was to create a championship series of monster truck races. TNT began the first recognized series in 1988, and was dominated by Bigfoot for much of the season. However, upstart rookie Rod Litzau, driving the USA-1 truck, gained momentum and passed Bigfoot in the standings going into the last weekend of the season in Louisville, Kentucky. With the way the points system and elimination brackets had been structured, Bigfoot (driven by Rich Hooser) and USA-1 met in the semifinal round with USA-1 clinching the points championship if it beat Bigfoot. USA-1 won the race in spectacular fashion, rolling over in the process, and took the championship. After losing the championship, the Bigfoot team made the decision to shift their focus less on competition and more on research and development in 1989, as well as running frequent events for the USHRA and USA Motorsports and a limited TNT Schedule.

During this time, Chandler began working with computer-aided design (CAD) programs, and using technology he had learned from professional off-road racing, designed a tubular frame for his next Bigfoot truck, along with a nitrogen suspension system sporting 24 inches of travel. This innovation allowed Bigfoot to possess four times as much suspension travel as those used by nearly all previous monster trucks. Chandler would be awarded a patent for his designs. After testing the vehicle for three months, driver Andy Brass debuted the eighth incarnation of Bigfoot, with the new frame and suspension, in late 1989. It officially made its debut at the Indiana State Fairgrounds in Indianapolis, Indiana at the Four Wheel and Off Road Jamboree in a special 5,000th show for Bigfoot (where every Bigfoot vehicle gathered in one place for the first time). It made its debut in competition at a USHRA race in the Astrodome in Houston, Texas, reaching the final round of competition before rolling over against Jack Willman's Taurus.

The following year, after running the USHRA races in Anaheim, California, and Pontiac, Michigan, the truck debuted on the TNT Motorsports Monster Truck Challenge points circuit in Memphis, Tennessee. The Bigfoot 8 chassis was briefly banned from the circuit on April 5, 1990, due to a rule clarification that only allowed leaf, coil, and coil-over suspensions to be run. Although TNT stated that safety was the primary reason for the clarification, they also admitted that another reason was that Bigfoot 8 was simply too technologically advanced and was upsetting the competitive balance of the series. Former BMX racer John Piant, piloting Bigfoot 4 raced in place of Bigfoot 8 in multiple events, and Andy Brass drove Bigfoot 4 to victory at the Louisville Motor Speedway. Bigfoot 8 returned to the TNT circuit after the temporary ban had been lifted. Chandler also took legal action against TNT.

Team Bigfoot ended up winning 24 events that season and took the 1990 TNT points championship over Greg Holbrook in Gary Cook's Equalizer and Gary Porter's Carolina Crusher, the first racing championship for the Bigfoot team. Also that year, Piant took the Special Events Triple Crown Championship, in addition to placing third in the USHRA's new point series. After not winning any championships in 1991, Team Bigfoot would go on a 12-year stretch from 1992 to 2003 of winning at least one championship a year, taking a total of 16 series championship victories during that span. 

As of 2019, Team Bigfoot has won a total of 50 series championships.

Present day
Bigfoot continues to be in demand. Sponsorships include Firestone, Summit Racing and Vi-Cor. In December 2005, Bigfoot's sponsorship with Ford ended, though was not announced officially until 2007.

Bigfoot ceased running events for the Monster Jam series in 1998 due to a dispute over  involving licensing of video footage and pictures, and has not returned since. Bigfoot also appeared frequently for USA Motorsports and Motorsports Entertainment Group until those companies were purchased by the USHRA's parent company at the time, PACE Motorsports.

Bigfoot still races for the Special Events Promotion Company, Chris Arel Motorsports, Toughest Monster Truck Tour, Monster Nation, Monster X Tour, Checkered Flag Promotions, and many others.

In May 2006, Bigfoot signed former professional wrestler and Monster Jam driver Debrah Miceli. Miceli drove the "Bigfoot 10" chassis until the end of the 2007 Major League of Monster Trucks (MLMT) season. Miceli now drives Madusa for Feld Motorsports.

In July 2010, Bigfoot sponsor Firestone, then a Major League Baseball sponsor, brought Bigfoot to the Major League Baseball All-Star Game as a show truck. In order to comply with MLB's official vehicle sponsorship while being used by Firestone, the Bigfoot 10 chassis featured a Chevrolet Silverado body. In March 2012, Bigfoot formed a partnership with Robby Gordon to promote both his SPEED Energy Drink and his new Stadium Super Trucks racing series. For the partnership, a chassis initially built for Gordon himself was dubbed Bigfoot 19. Despite a promotional picture depicting the body as being a Ford, this truck would also compete with a highly modified Silverado body.

For his innovation of creating monster trucks, Bob Chandler has been inducted into multiple halls of fame. In 2006, he was inducted in the Missouri Sports Hall of Fame. In November 2011, he was inducted into the International Monster Truck Museum Hall of Fame with its inaugural class. Former driver Jim Kramer was inducted into the second class the following year. Also, in 2013, Chandler was inducted into the Off-road Motorsports Hall of Fame.

On November 30, 2018, Bigfoot was announced as one of the participants in the new Hot Wheels Monster Trucks Live tour being coproduced by Hot Wheels owner Mattel and the Raycom-Legacy Content Company. This reunites a marketing relationship dating back to the 1980s.

List of vehicles
The following is a list of all the vehicles built or owned by Bigfoot 4×4, Inc. Bigfoot #13 was skipped due to superstition regarding the number 13.

Other vehicles

Snake Bite

Snake Bite is an alternate name and appearance sometimes used when a second truck is scheduled to appear at the same event. The first Snake Bite (using Bigfoot 4's chassis) was originally driven by Gene Patterson, under the pseudonym of Colt Cobra. He wore a mask to hide his identity and came from the fictional town of Cobra Creek, Colorado. Other Bigfoot trucks and drivers have used the identities over the years.

Video games
Bigfoot has been the focus of multiple video games. The first Bigfoot video game was released in 1990 by Acclaim Entertainment for the Nintendo Entertainment System. Bigfoot is also the featured truck in the Monster Truck Madness series by Microsoft from the 1990s. Bigfoot: Collision Course was released on multiple platforms in 2008. Monster Truck Destruction, released on iOS and Android platforms in 2012, also features multiple Bigfoot trucks. Bigfoot Crush is a 2020 arcade game released by UNIS.

Film and television appearances
The original Bigfoot appears in the 1981 film Take This Job and Shove It, where it appears as the main character's personal truck. This was the first appearance of a monster truck in film. A virtual Bigfoot is used by the character Aech inside the virtual reality universe OASIS in the 2018 film Ready Player One. Other appearances by Bigfoot trucks in film include Cannonball Run 2, Police Academy 2: Their First Assignment, Road House, Police Academy 6: City Under Siege, Tango & Cash, and Charlie's Angels: Full Throttle. 

Bigfoot has also been a prominent part of animated TV series. Bigfoot and the Muscle Machines was a 1985 animated miniseries produced by Marvel Productions as part of their Super Sunday anthology series. A self-aware version of Bigfoot was one of the main characters of the animated series, The Power Team; it was included to advertise the NES game. A Discovery Kids TV series called Bigfoot Presents: Meteor and the Mighty Monster Trucks was released in 2006.

Legacy
Bigfoot was listed by Hot Rod magazine as one of 100 most influential vehicles in the history of hot rodding for its February 2009 issue, it was ranked 69th.

The truck also entered the International Monster Truck Hall of Fame in 2011.

See also
 List of monster trucks

References

External links

 

Monster trucks
Off-road vehicles
Sports entertainment
Vehicles introduced in 1975